Doucet is a French language surname, especially popular in Canada, the former area of Acadia in particular (now Nova Scotia, New Brunswick, Prince Edward Island, and parts of Quebec and New England).

As a result of the Great Expulsion in 1755 and later from Acadia, Doucets are also amongst the Cajuns and Creoles of Louisiana.

The first Doucet to reach North America is thought to be Major Germain Doucet dit La Verdure, a French military officer at Port-Royal (now Annapolis Royal) in 1632 who attempted to defend what is now Maine and Acadia from invasions from Boston in 1654. Many Doucets in North America trace their lineage to Germain Doucet.

Variants and pronunciation
Common variants include "Doucett" and "Doucette". Most Doucets in Canada pronounce their surname as "DOU-set" or "Dou-SET", rather than "Dou-SAY" as modern French might require. Some argue this pronunciation may derive from dialects of sixteenth-century French such as was found in Brittany, a common origin of French-Canadian settlers; however Dou-SAY is the most popular pronunciation among Cajuns in Louisiana.

Notable people

 Albert Doucet (born 1942), Canadian businessman and politician from New Brunswick
 Alexandre-Joseph Doucet (1880–1951), Canadian farmer and politician from New Brunswick
 Andrea Doucet, Canadian sociologist and writer
 Benoit Doucet (born 1963), Canadian-German ice hockey coach
 Cat Doucet (1899–1975), American sheriff from Louisiana
 Camey Doucet (born 1939), American musician and disc jockey
 Camille Doucet (1812–1895), French poet and playwright
 Catherine Doucet (1875–1958), American actress
 Clément Doucet (1895–1950), Belgian composer and jazz/classical pianist
 Clive Doucet (born 1946), Canadian politician and writer
 Early Doucet (born 1985), American football player
 Fred Doucet (born 1939), Canadian lobbyist, educator, university administrator, and political aide
 George Doucet (born 1939), Canadian high school principal and politician from Nova Scotia
 Gerald Doucet (born 1937), Canadian politician from Nova Scotia
 Germain Doucet (1595 – c.1654), called Sieur de la Verdure, French commandant in Maine and Acadia
 Gilbert Doucet (1956–2020), French rugby player
 Henri Lucien Doucet (1856–1895), French painter
 Jacques Doucet (disambiguation), multiple people, including:
 Jacques Doucet (fashion designer) (1853–1929), French fashion designer 
 Jacques Doucet (sportscaster) (born 1940), French-Canadian sportscaster
 Jacques Doucet (sailor), French sailor 
 Jeff Doucet (died 1984), American kidnapper and child molester, killed by Gary Plauché
 J. André Doucet (1880–1963), Canadian politician from New Brunswick 
 Julie Doucet (born 1965), Canadian cartoonist
 Luke Doucet (born 1973), Canadian singer-songwriter and guitarist 
 Lyse Doucet (born 1958), Canadian journalist, presenter and correspondent for the BBC
 Michael Doucet (born 1951), American fiddler, singer and songwriter
 Moses J. Doucet (1862–1906), Canadian merchant and politician from Nova Scotia
 Paul Doucet, Canadian actor
 Rick Doucet, Canadian businessman and politician from New Brunswick
 Roger Doucet (1919–1981), Canadian singer
 Sandrine Doucet (1959–2019), French politician
 Suzanne Doucet (born 1944), German composer and producer
 Tommy Doucet (1902–1992), Acadian fiddler, from Nova Scotia, Canada
 Yves Doucet, the name taken by Yves Dreyfus (born 1931), Olympic medalist épée fencer, to escape Nazi detection during the Nazi occupation of France.

References

French-language surnames
Surnames